Diphyonyx garutti, formerly Brachygeophilus sukacevi garutti, is a species of soil centipede in the family Geophilidae found in the most western part of the Caucasus range, north of the Black Sea. It's characterized by having 2–4 slender filaments on the mid-part of the labrum, condyles between the anterior trunk sterna, and a single, isolated pore on each coxo-pleuron.

References 

Geophilomorpha
Animals described in 2008
Myriapods of Europe